Robert Anthony Southcombe (born 21 July 1950) is a former Australian rules football player who played for the Carlton Football Club in the Victorian Football League in 1977. Southcombe was a bespectacled ruckman who played 13 games for Carlton in 1977 before returning to the bush.

References

External links
 
 

Australian rules footballers from Victoria (Australia)
1950 births
Living people
Carlton Football Club players
Golden Square Football Club players